Elijah Conner Phister (October 8, 1822 – May 16, 1887) was a United States representative from Kentucky. He was born in Maysville, Kentucky. He attended the Seminary of Rand and Richardson in Maysville, Kentucky and was graduated from Augusta College, Kentucky in August 1840. He studied law, was admitted to the bar, and commenced practice in 1844.

Phister served as mayor of Maysville, Kentucky in 1848. He was a circuit judge 1856-1862 and a member of the Kentucky House of Representatives 1867-1871. He was appointed one of the commissioners to revise the Kentucky statutes in 1872 but declined. Phister was elected as a Democrat to the Forty-sixth and Forty-seventh Congresses (March 4, 1879 – March 3, 1883). After leaving Congress, he resumed the practice of law. He died in Maysville, Kentucky in 1887 and was buried in the City Cemetery.

References

External links

 

1822 births
1887 deaths
Kentucky lawyers
Kentucky state court judges
Mayors of places in Kentucky
Democratic Party members of the Kentucky House of Representatives
People from Maysville, Kentucky
Democratic Party members of the United States House of Representatives from Kentucky
19th-century American politicians
19th-century American judges
19th-century American lawyers
Augusta College (Kentucky) alumni